Paul Woolford may refer to:

 Paul Woolford (field hockey) (born 1977), New Zealand field hockey player
 Paul Woolford (DJ), UK dance music producer